The United Kingdom held a national preselection to choose the song that would go to the Eurovision Song Contest 1966, with the BBC selecting Kenneth McKellar to perform all the entries under consideration. After performing the five shortlisted songs weekly on BBC1's Kenneth McKellar's A Song For Everyone, the final was held on 27 January 1966 and presented by David Jacobs. McKellar released an extended play maxi single featuring the five songs, subsequently releasing a single featuring the winner and the runner up, which reached number 30 in the UK singles chart.

Viewers cast votes on postcards via mail to choose the winning song, which was "A Man Without Love". At the Eurovision Song Contest, McKellar performed last in the contest, finishing ninth out of 18 entries, the worst showing to date for a British entry; a record maintained until 1978.

Before Eurovision

A Song for Europe 1966

At Eurovision
"A Man Without Love" won the national and went on to come ninth in the contest.

For the sixth and final time, David Jacobs provided the commentary for BBC Television. British Forces Radio also broadcast the contest with commentary provided by Ian Fenner. Michael Aspel served as spokesperson for the U.K Jury.

Voting

References

1966
Countries in the Eurovision Song Contest 1966
Eurovision
Eurovision